Skeletal Circus Derails is the first known recording by Daisyhead & the Mooncrickets. It is a 6-song recording and is the namesake of Dax Riggs' fan site SkeletalCircus.com.

Track listing
 "The Skeletal Circus Derails" – 3:25
 "As Gone As Gone Can Be" – 2:48
 "Seahorses (Acid Quest)" – 2:18
 "Wander The Day Away (Come The Morning)" – 4:20
 "Downtown" – 2:53
 "Instrumental" – 0:40

1995 albums